The following is a list of notable reconnaissance units from around the world.

Australia

Australian Army
Royal Australian Regiment
Reconnaissance, Snipers and Surveillance Platoons
Regional Force Surveillance Units
North-West Mobile Force (NORFORCE)
Pilbara Regiment
51st Battalion, Far North Queensland Regiment
Royal Australian Artillery
20th Surveillance and Target Acquisition Regiment
Australian Army Aviation
161st Reconnaissance Squadron
162nd Reconnaissance Squadron
Royal Australian Armoured Corps
1st Armoured Regiment
2nd Cavalry Regiment
2nd/14th Light Horse Regiment (Queensland Mounted Infantry)
1st/15th Royal New South Wales Lancers
4th/19th Prince of Wales's Light Horse
12th/16th Hunter River Lancers
3rd/9th Light Horse (South Australian Mounted Rifles)
10th Light Horse Regiment
Special Operations Command
Special Air Service Regiment
1st Commando Regiment reconnaissance platoon
2nd Commando Regiment reconnaissance platoon

Royal Australian Air Force
Air Combat Group RAAF
No. 4 Squadron RAAF
Surveillance & Response Group RAAF
No. 10 Squadron RAAF
No. 11 Squadron RAAF

Royal Australian Navy
Clearance Diving Branch

Brazil

Brazilian Army
Special Operations Platoons (Pelotão de operações especiais/Pelopes)
Paratroopers Brigade (Brigada de Infantaria Pára-quedista), Pathfinders company (companhia de precursores paraquedistas)
Special Operations Command (Comando de Operações Especiais), 1st BAC-DRC (Snipers and Reconnaissance Detachment), 1st B F ESP - 5th Dofesp (5° Operational Detachment)

Brazilian Navy
Brazilian Marine Corps (Corpo de Fuzileiros Navais)
Marines Infantry Reconnaissace and Surveillance Platoons (Pelotões de Reconhecimento e Vigilância da Infantaria de fuzileiros navais).
1st Riverine Operations Battalion (1° Batalhão de Operações Ribeirinhas), Pelopesp (Special Operation Platoon)                                
Marine Special Operations Battalion (Batalhão de Operações Especiais de Fuzileiros Navais, Batalhão Tonelero), 1st Special Operations Company

Canada
Pathfinders
(1st Battalion, Royal Canadian Regiment) Infantry Recce Platoon
(2nd Battalion, Royal Canadian Regiment) Infantry Recce Platoon
(3rd Battalion, Royal Canadian Regiment) Airborne Infantry Recce Platoon 
(3rd Battalion, Royal Canadian Regiment) Pathfinder / Sniper Platoon
(Canadian Special Operations Regiment) CSOR
(Canadian Rangers) Long Range Arctic Patrol 
The Royal Canadian Dragoons (Armoured Reconnaissance)
(12e Régiment blindé du Canada) Recce Squadron 
Lord Strathcona's Horse (Royal Canadians) Recce Squadron
(3rd Battalion, Royal 22nd Regiment) (Peloton Fantassin de Reconnaissance) 
(3rd Battalion, Royal Canadian Regiment) Infantry Recce Platoon 
1st Battalion, Princess Patricia's Canadian Light Infantry Recce Platoon
2nd Battalion, Princess Patricia's Canadian Light Infantry Infantry Recce Platoon
3rd Battalion, Princess Patricia's Canadian Light Infantry Recce Platoon
Kings Own Calgary Regiment (RCAC) Armoured Recce - Primary reserve Unit
Queens York Rangers (1st American) (RCAC) Armoured Recce - Primary Reserve Unit
South Alberta Light Horse (SALH) Armoured Recce - Primary Reserve Unit

Denmark
Guard Hussar Regiment
3rd Recce Battalions
1st Light Recce Squadron
2nd Light Recce Squadron
3rd Light Recce Squadron (inactive until 2023)
Danish Home Guard
Home Guard Command
Special Support and Reconnaissance

France
13th Parachute Dragoon Regiment, a regiment of the French Army Special Forces Brigade; its primary mission is long range reconnaissance.
2nd Hussard Regiment, a regiment of the Brigade de Renseignement; it performs similar missions to the benefit of local units.
Commandos Marine "de Penfentenyo"; specialize in reconnaissance.
Commando Parachute Group 11th Parachute Brigade's reconnaissance and deep action section.

Georgia
Special operations forces
Infantry brigade reconnaissance companies.

Germany

EGB Forces
Kampfschwimmer
Kommando Spezialkräfte
Taktisches Luftwaffengeschwader 51 (Luftwaffe tactical reconnaissance wing, formerly designated as Aufklärungsgeschwader 51)
Fernspäher
Heeresaufklärungstruppe

Greece
ETA and Z' MAK of the Hellenic Army's 1st Raider/Paratrooper Brigade (LRRP and amphibious reconnaissance, respectively)

Ireland
Irish Army Cavalry Corps Cavalry Corps

Italy
185th Paratroopers Reconnaissance Target Acquisition Regiment "Folgore"

India

Indian Army
Para Commandos (India)
Ghatak Force
Parachute Regiment

Indian Air Force
Garud Commando Force

Indian Navy
MARCOS

Paramilitary forces
Special Frontier Force
Commando Battalion for Resolute Action

Indonesia
3rd Group Sandi Yudha, Army Special Forces Command (Kopassus)
2nd Special Operations Detachment, Navy Special Forces (Kopaska) 
Amphibious Reconnassiance Battalion (Taifib), Indonesian Marine Corps
Cavalry Reconnaissance Company (Kikavtai), Cavalry Corps, Indonesian Army
Combat Reconnaissance Platoon, Kostrad, Indonesian Army
Pathfinder Platoon (Pleton Pandu Udara), Airborne Brigade, Indonesian Army
Paskhas, Indonesian Air Force

Israel
Ground Forces
Infantry Corps (Battalions)
Brigade Reconnaissance Battalions & Companies
93rd Reconnaissance Battalion – Kfir Brigade
631st Reconnaissance Battalion – Golani Brigade
846th Reconnaissance Battalion – Givati Brigade
934th Reconnaissance Battalion – Nahal Brigade
5135th Reconnaissance Battalion – Paratroopers Brigade
Reserve Brigades Reconnaissance Battalions
Oz Brigade (Commandos)
Unit Maglan
Unit Egoz
Unit Duvdevan
Multidimensional Unit
Armoured Corps (Companies)
Palsar 7 – the 7th Armored Brigade reconnaissance unit.
Palsar 401 – the 401st Brigade reconnaissance unit.
Palsar 188 – the 188th Armored Brigade reconnaissance unit. (Reserve)
Reserve Brigades Reconnaissance Companies
Combat Engineer Corps
Battalion Recon/Scout Platoons
Unit Yahalom (Generally referred to as a commando unit)
Sayeret Yael 
Combat Intelligence Collection Corps
Infantry Forces "YAHMAM"
Artillery Corps
Unit Sky Rider
Sayeret Matkal
Air Force
7th Wing
Unit Shaldag
Navy
Shayetet 13
Military Intelligence Directorate
Special Operations Command
Sayeret Matkal
Collective Units
Unit 8200
Field SIGINT Collection Unit

Netherlands
11 BVE, 42 BVE, 43 BVE (brigade reconnaissance squadrons)
104 JVE (Ground-Based Long-Range Recce Squadrons), Joint ISTAR Command (JISTARC)
Pathfinders (Airmobile)
Korps Commandotroepen
C-Squadron, Maritime Special Operations Forces, includes Mountain Leader Reconnaissance Platoon and Amphibious Reconnaissance Platoon
15 RSTA Squadron, 25 RSTA Squadron of the Marine Combat Groups, RNLMC.
Reconnaissance Platoons of RNLA Infantry Battalions.

New Zealand
Royal New Zealand Infantry Regiment
Reconnaissance platoons
Special Operations Command
New Zealand Special Air Service

Philippines
Marine Special Operations Group
Philippine Army 1st Scout Ranger Regiment
Special Action Force

Portugal
Companhia de Precursores Aeroterrestres
Destacamento de Acções Especiais
Grupo de Operações Especiais
Operações Especiais aka Rangers

Russia
Federal Security Service "FSB"
Alpha Group Directorate "A" of the FSB Special Purpose Center (TsSN FSB), is an elite, stand-alone sub-unit of Russia's special forces.
Vympel Group Directorate "B"  Vympel Group is an elite Russian spetsnaz unit under the command of the FSB. (TsSN FSB)
Armed Forces of the Russian Federation
Spetsnaz GRU: 2nd, 3rd, 10th, 14th, 16th, 24th, 25th Spetsnaz Brigade (obrSpN)
45th Detached Reconnaissance Regiment Specnaz VDV (orpSpN)
Russian commando frogmen: 42nd, 420th, 431th, 561th Naval Reconnaissance Spetsnaz Point (omrpSpN)
Voennaa Razvedka (Razvedchiki Scouts) "Military intelligence" personnel/units within larger formations in ground troops, airborne troops and marines. Intelligence battalion in the division, reconnaissance company in the brigade, a reconnaissance platoon in the regiment. The level of training is the same as Spetsnaz GRU but not controlled by the GRU. Mascot: bat.

Serbia
72nd Reconnaissance-Commando Battalion

South Africa
South African Special Forces
44 Parachute Regiment
1 Parachute Battalion
44 Pathfinder Platoon

Sweden
Life Regiment Hussars, 32nd Intelligence Battalion (ISTAR) 
Norrland Dragoon Regiment (I 19), Army Ranger Battalion
1st Marine Regiment (Amf 1), 202nd Coastal Ranger Company
Swedish Air Force, Swedish Air Force Rangers
Swedish Home Guard, Home Guard reconnaissance companies

United Kingdom

British Army
Light Cavalry & Armoured Cavalry Regiments
Household Cavalry Regiment
1st The Queen's Dragoon Guards & Royal Yeomanry
Royal Scots Dragoon Guards & Scottish & North Irish Yeomanry
Royal Dragoon Guards
Royal Lancers (Queen Elizabeth’s own)
The Light Dragoons & Queen's Own Yeomanry
Infantry Battalion Reconnaissance Platoons
4/73 (Sphinx) Special Observation Post Battery RA
Honourable Artillery Company
Pathfinder Platoon, 16 Air Assault Brigade
Patrol Platoon, 2nd Battalion, Parachute Regiment
Patrol Platoon, 3rd Battalion, Parachute Regiment
Reconnaissance Corps
Special Air Service
Special Reconnaissance Regiment
Special Reconnaissance Unit

Royal Navy
Brigade Reconnaissance Force, Royal Marines
Reconnaissance Troop (40 Commando, 3 Commando Brigade, Royal Marine Corps, Her Majesty's Naval Service)
Reconnaissance Troop (42 Commando, 3 Commando Brigade, Royal Marine Corps, Her Majesty's Naval Service)
Reconnaissance Troop (45 Commando, 3 Commando Brigade, Royal Marine Corps, Her Majesty's Naval Service)
Mountain Leader Training Cadre
Special Boat Service

Royal Air Force
No. 5 Squadron RAF
No. 51 Squadron RAF

United States

United States Army
United States Army Infantry Scouts and Special Reconnaissance Platoons
United States Army Special Operations Command
United States Army Special Forces (Green Berets)
SOT-A (Special Operations Team-Alpha)
Combat Applications Group (Delta Force)
75th Ranger Regiment
U.S. Army Infantry Long Range Surveillance
U.S. Army Infantry Battalion Reconnaissance Platoons
U.S. Army Field Artillery Advance Party Teams
Army Cavalry Scouts

United States Marine Corps
United States Marine Corps Special Operations Command (MARSOC)
Marine Force Reconnaissance
Marine Division Reconnaissance
Surveillance and Target Acquisition (STA) Platoon
Scout-Sniper Platoon
Light Armored Reconnaissance
Radio Battalion
United States Marine Corps Field Artillery Advance Party Teams

United States Air Force
United States Air Force Special Tactics

United States Navy
United States Navy SEALs
Navy SWCC
Special amphibious reconnaissance corpsman
Seabee Engineer Reconnaissance Team

Vietnam

Vietnam People's Army
Each Corps and Military Region in VPA have 1 Recon Battalion. In each Battalion have 2 Land Recon Companies or 2 Mechanical Recon Companies and 1 Special Recon Company.
701st Special Recon Battalion of 1st Corps
1st Special Recon Battalion of 2nd Corps
28th Special Recon Battalion of 3rd Corps
46th Special Recon Battalion of 4th Corps
20th Recon Battalion of High Command of Capital Hanoi
31st Recon Battalion of 1st Military Region
20th Recon Battalion of 2nd Military Region
31st Recon Battalion of 3rd Military Region
12th Recon Battalion of 4th Military Region
32nd Recon Battalion of 5th Military Region
47th Recon Battalion of 7th Military Region
Recon Battalion under the staff HQ of 9th Military Region
Beside, each Army Division, independent Regiment, Commando Brigade and provincial military command also have 1 Recon Company.

References

Reconnaissance
Reconnaissance